Rakhine United FC is a professional football club based in Rakhine State that plays in the Myanmar National League. The Rakhine United Football Club changed its name to Rakhapura United in December 2010. The club's original home stadium was Waytharli Yinpyin (which can be found in Sittwe Township) which was later changed to Thuwanna YTC Stadium. Last season, Rakhapura United FC stood in 10th position. Rakhine United FC had the biggest win (7-2) in General Aung San Cup against Manaw Myay. Rakhine United FC has a Facebook page which can be found here.

Sponsorship

Club

Coaching staff
{|class="wikitable"
|-
!Position
!Staff
|-
|Manager|| U Win Tin
|-
|rowspan="3"|Assistant Manager|| U Maung Maung Myint
|-
| U Nyunt Win
|-
|U Kyaing Than 
|-
|Goalkeeper Coach|| U Aye Thar
|-
|Fitness Coach|| U Nan Da Kyaw
|-
|Youth Team Head Coach|| U Aung Zaw Myo
|-

Other information

|-

General Aung San Shield

Squad information

First team squad

References
Myanmar - Rakhapura United FC
Myanmar National League - Rakhapura United FC

External links 

 

Rakhine United